Akitoshi (written: 彰敏, 彰俊, 秋敏 or 明要) is a masculine Japanese given name. Notable people with the name include:

, Japanese jazz saxophonist
, Japanese video game designer
, Japanese professional wrestler
, Japanese mixed martial artist
, Japanese sumo wrestler

Japanese masculine given names